Rose's Corral is a former settlement in Nevada County, California, United States. Established during the summer of 1848, it is notable for being the county's first settlement. It is named for a cattle corral built by John Rose, a trader.

References

Former settlements in Nevada County, California
Former populated places in California